Michel Carrega (born 25 September 1934) is a retired French trap shooter. He competed at the 1968, 1972, 1976 and 1984 Olympics and won a silver medal in 1972. He was a world champion in 1970, 1971, 1974 and 1979.

References

1934 births
Living people
French male sport shooters
Trap and double trap shooters
Olympic shooters of France
Shooters at the 1968 Summer Olympics
Shooters at the 1972 Summer Olympics
Shooters at the 1976 Summer Olympics
Shooters at the 1984 Summer Olympics
Olympic silver medalists for France
Olympic medalists in shooting
Medalists at the 1972 Summer Olympics
20th-century French people